Dylan Sikura (born June 1, 1995) is a Canadian professional ice hockey centre for the San Diego Gulls of the American Hockey League (AHL) while under contract to the Anaheim Ducks of the National Hockey League (NHL). He was drafted by the Chicago Blackhawks in the sixth round, 178th overall, in the 2014 NHL Entry Draft. Before turning professional, Sikura played college ice hockey with Northeastern University, where he was named to the AHCA East First-Team All-American and the Hockey East First All-Star team.

Playing career
Sikura played for the Aurora Tigers of the Ontario Junior Hockey League for three years before committing to play for Northeastern University in February 2014. That June, Sikura was drafted 178th overall in the sixth round of the 2014 NHL Entry Draft by the Chicago Blackhawks.

Sikura played hockey for four years at Northeastern University. In the 2016–17 season Sikura was named to the Hockey East Second Team All-Star and named a Hobey Baker Award candidate. In his last year with the Huskies, Sikura and the Huskies won the program's first Beanpot championship in 30 years, defeating Boston University by a score of 5–2. Sikura recorded a pair of assists during the championship game. At the conclusion of the season, Sikura was again named a Hobey Baker candidate, and named to the First Team All-Star and Hockey East All-Tournament Team. He was also named an AHCA East First-Team All-American along with teammates Adam Gaudette and Jeremy Davies. He finished his career with Northeastern with 146 points, placing him 14th in the program's all-time scoring list.

On March 25, 2018, Sikura signed a two-year entry-level contract with the Chicago Blackhawks. He made his NHL debut on March 29, 2018, in a game against the Winnipeg Jets. He recorded his first two NHL points in his debut, with assists on Erik Gustafsson's goal and Alex DeBrincat's goal.

After attending the Blackhawks training camp prior to the 2018–19 season, Sikura was reassigned to the Blackhawks American Hockey League affiliate, the Rockford IceHogs. On December 12, Sikura was called up the NHL for the first time that season after recording 18 points in 26 games, leading the team in goals and points. After playing in 11 games with the Blackhawks and collecting three points, Sikura was reassigned to the IceHogs. On February 11, Sikura was again called up from Rockford and played his first game back the next day against the Boston Bruins. After nearly two months in the NHL, Sikura was reassigned to the IceHogs on April 2 to help the team qualify for the 2019 Calder Cup playoffs.

On June 28, 2019, the Blackhawks re-signed Sikura to a two-year contract extension. After beginning the season with the IceHogs, Sikura was recalled to the NHL on December 8. Upon his recall, Sikura was leading the team with nine goals and 16 points in 22 games. On January 5, 2020, Sikura recorded his first career NHL goal against the Detroit Red Wings to clinch a 4–2 win.

On September 28, 2020, Sikura was traded by the Blackhawks to the Vegas Golden Knights in exchange for Brandon Pirri.

On July 29, 2021, having left the Golden Knights organization, Sikura was signed as a free agent to a one-year, two-way contract with the Colorado Avalanche. After attending the 2021 Avalanche training camp, Sikura was assigned to AHL affiliate, the Colorado Eagles, to begin the 2021–22 season. In a first-line offensive role with the Eagles, Sikura established career highs to finish sixth in league scoring with 33 goals and 40 assists for 73 points in just 60 regular season games. He made 5 appearances through a recall to the Avalanche, registering 1 assist. In the playoffs with the Eagles, Sikura was limited by injury to 6 post-season games, collecting 4 points. Sikura remained a part of the Avalanche black aces squad through the remainder of the playoffs, as the club went on to claim the Stanley Cup.

As a free agent from the Avalanche at the conclusion of his contract, Sikura opted to return to his original club by re-joining the Chicago Blackhawks on a one-year, two-way contract on July 14, 2022. In his return to the Blackhawks, Sikura rejoined former AHL club the Rockford IceHogs for the 2022–23 season, and collected 12 goals and 32 points through 52 games. On March 2, 2023, the Blackhawks traded Sikura to the Anaheim Ducks in exchange for prospect Max Golod.

International play
Sikura represented Team Canada at the 2017 Spengler Cup in Davos, Switzerland. He played in four games and recorded one point to help Canada win the tournament.

Sikura was named to Team Canada's pre-Olympic roster for the 2018 Winter Olympics but failed to make the final roster.

Personal life
Sikura's brother Tyler is currently playing hockey in the AHL for the Cleveland Monsters. Sikura is half Slovakian. His grandfather escaped Czechoslovakia and arrived in Nova Scotia in the 1950s. He ran a thoroughbred race horse breeding farm, Hill 'n' Dale Farms, which was later taken over by Sikura's uncle and father after his grandfather's death.

Sikura is also half Japanese.

Career statistics

Regular season and playoffs

International

Awards and honours

References

External links
 

1995 births
Living people
AHCA Division I men's ice hockey All-Americans
Canadian ice hockey centres
Chicago Blackhawks draft picks
Chicago Blackhawks players
Colorado Avalanche players
Colorado Eagles players
Henderson Silver Knights players
Ice hockey people from Ontario
Northeastern Huskies men's ice hockey players
Rockford IceHogs (AHL) players
San Diego Gulls (AHL) players
Sportspeople from Aurora, Ontario
Vegas Golden Knights players